This is a list of earthquakes in 1940. Only magnitude 6.0 or greater earthquakes appear on the list. Lower magnitude events are included if they have caused death, injury or damage. Events which occurred in remote areas will be excluded from the list as they wouldn't have generated significant media interest. All dates are listed according to UTC time. Overall, with 13 magnitude 7.0+ events worldwide, this was a fairly busy year. The death toll was substantially lower than 1939. The most significant event in terms of lives lost was in Romania in November with 1,000 deaths. Other quakes in China and Peru resulted in significant fatalities.

Overall

By death toll 

 Note: At least 10 casualties

By magnitude 

 Note: At least 7.0 magnitude

Notable events

January

February

March

April

May

June

July

August

September

October

November

December

References

1940
 
1940